The Notikewin River is a tributary of the Peace River in northern Alberta, Canada. The Notikewin Provincial Park is established at the mouth of the river.

The name derives from nôtinikewin (ᓅᑎᓂᑫᐃᐧᐣ), the Cree word for "battle". The name is shared with the settlement of Notikewin, and is lent to the Notikewin Member, a stratigraphical unit of the Western Canadian Sedimentary Basin.

Course
It flows in east and north-east, along the southern slopes of the Halverson Ridge, where it receives the waters from the Square Creek and Alleman Creek. It turns east and receives waters from the Rambling Creek, Lovet Creek and Jim Creek.

It flows through the town of Manning, where it is crossed by the Mackenzie Highway and Railink Mackenzie Northern Railway. The settlement of Notikewin is situated immediately north of Manning. The river continues north-east through the Peace Country, receiving the waters of Stowe Creek, Soldar Creek and Hotchkiss River. It continues north-east between Highway 741 and Highway 692, where the Meikle River and Gravina Creek merge into the river, east of Hawk Hills.

Tributaries

Square Creek
Alleman Creek
Rambling Creek
Lovet Creek
Jim Creek
Stowe Creek
Soldar Creek
Hotchkiss River
Meikle River
Gravina Creek

See also
List of rivers of Alberta

References

Rivers of Alberta